AaB, (full name: Aalborg Boldspilklub) internationally referred to as Aalborg BK, or sometimes also known as AaB Aalborg, is a professional football team located in Aalborg. The club is represented in the Danish Superliga and has won four Danish football Championships and three Danish Cup trophies. Most recently the team won the double in 2014.

AaB was founded on 13 May 1885 by English engineers who were building Jutland's railway system, and the first years was concentrated on the game of cricket. It was initially named Aalborg Cricketklub (Aalborg Cricket club) but the name of the club was changed to Aalborg Boldklub (Aalborg ballclub) in 1899. Football was adopted on an amateur basis in 1902, and has since been the main sport, as the name was changed to the current Aalborg Boldspilklub af 1885 (Aalborg ballgameclub of 1885) in 1906.

In 1995 AaB became the first Danish team to participate in the UEFA Champions League group stage when they were awarded a place because Dynamo Kyiv was expelled from the tournament after one game for attempted match-fixing. AaB qualified for the 2008–09 Champions League and is with two appearances the Danish club who has participated the second most in the tournament after F.C. Copenhagen.

History
AaB was founded on 13 May 1885 by English engineers who were building Jutland's railway system, and the first years was concentrated on the game of cricket. It was initially named Aalborg Cricketklub (Aalborg Cricket club) but the name of the club was changed to Aalborg Boldklub (Aalborg ballclub) in 1899. Football was adopted on an amateur basis in 1902, and has since been the main sport, as the name was changed to the current Aalborg Boldspilklub af 1885 (Aalborg ballgameclub of 1885) in 1906.

Aalborg BK was part of the top-flight Danish leagues from the 1928–29 season, until the relegation of the club in 1947. The club returned to the best league in 1963, and except from the years of 1972, 1978 and 1981–1986, Aalborg BK has since been a part of the various editions of the Danish football championship. Despite its many years in the Danish championship, the club never won a championship title, but Aalborg BK won the Danish Cup competition in 1966 and 1970. Paid football was introduced in Denmark by the Danish Football Association in 1978. As Aalborg BK returned to the best Danish league, the club founded the professional branch of AaB A/S in 1987 to run a professional football team.

Through the 1990s, the club won its first two Danish championships. In the Danish Superliga 1994-95 season, 24 goals from league topscorer Erik Bo Andersen secured the championship title for the team of coach Poul Erik Andreasen. The club was initially eliminated by Dynamo Kyiv in the qualification matches for the UEFA Champions League 1995-96, but following a bribing scandal Kyiv was banned from the tournament and Aalborg BK entered in their place. Aalborg BK thus became the first Danish team to compete in the UEFA Champions League. As they managed a 2–1 home win over Panathinaikos and a 2–2 draw with Porto in the six matches the club played in the initial group stage, Aalborg BK was eliminated. Erik Bo Andersen left the club for Scottish club Rangers, but in Søren Frederiksen, the club found its next goal-getter. Though not the league top scorer, Frederiksen scored 17 goals in the Danish Superliga 1998-99 which the club won under guidance of Swedish coach Hans Backe. Once again, Aalborg BK faced Dinamo Kyiv in the Champions League qualification, but again felt short, losing 1–2 at home and drawing 2–2 in Kyiv after a late Aalborg BK goal was disallowed for being behind the goal line.

Since then, the club established itself in the top half of the Superliga and won a bronze medal and qualified for the 2007 UEFA Intertoto Cup. Aalborg beat Honka on the away goals rule (2–2 in Finland and 1–1 in Denmark) in the second round, and in the third and final round Aalborg BK faced Gent and drew, 1–1, in the away game but beat them 2–1 in the following home match. Thus they "won" a place in the UEFA Cup's second qualification round and met HJK, the first match ended 2–1 to Helsinki, but in the last match Aalborg BK won 3–0 and were thus ready for the UEFA Cup 2007-08. Drawing the Italian team Sampdoria in the First Round, which have Antonio Cassano and Vincenzo Montella as notable players, made the task seem impossible. Aalborg made it again on the away goal rule (getting 2–2 in Genoa and managing 0–0 in Aalborg), and qualified for the group stage – being the first Danish team ever, to send an Italian team "out of Europe." In the group stage Aalborg BK was seeded in the lowest pot, and drew Anderlecht, Tottenham Hotspur, Getafe, and Hapoel Tel Aviv. Drawing with Anderlecht at home, and losing 2–3 to Tottenham (after being ahead 2–0 after the first half) forced Aalborg to win at home against Getafe, a match Aalborg BK lost 1–2.

In the 2007–08 season, Aalborg won their third Danish Championship and qualified for the 2008–09 UEFA Champions League qualifying rounds. in the second qualifying round, Aalborg easily eliminated FK Modriča 7–1 on aggregate. In the third round, before the group stage, they defeated FBK Kaunas 2–0 both at home and away and reached the group stage of the Champions League for the second time, the first time a Danish team achieved this. In the group stage, they were drawn in Group E along with defending champions Manchester United, Villarreal and Celtic.  Aalborg finished third in the group, ahead of Celtic, with 6 points and progressed to the 2008–09 UEFA Cup knockout stage.

Their first match in their UEFA Cup run was against Spanish side Deportivo de La Coruña. Aalborg BK won the first leg at home 3–0 and the second leg at the Estadio Riazor 1–3, securing a 6–1 aggregate. Aalborg BK thereby earned a place among the last 16 teams. where they faced Manchester City. After a 2–0 loss in Manchester in the first leg Aalborg BK fought back to tie the score with a 2–0 win at home. The tie ended in agony however, as Aalborg were defeated by 4–3 on penalties.

On 11 May 2014, the club won their 4th Danish Championship, and four days later the double was secured, as the club defeated F.C. Copenhagen 4–2 in the Cup final.

Stadium

Since 1920, Aalborg BK has played its games at Aalborg Stadion. The stadium was opened on 18 July 1920 with a north-south aligned playing field. The first spectator seats were built in 1927, and in 1937 a wooden terrace for 3,000 standing spectators was built. In 1960, the stadium burned down and a new east-western aligned concrete stadium was opened in 1962. In recent years the stadium has been enlarged and rebuilt so that it now has modern facilities and roof over all spectator stands. The stadium currently has a capacity of 13,997 people (8,997 seats) or 10,500 people (all seats).

Supporters and rivalries
Aalborg BK's official fanclub is AaB Support Club. Formed in 1990, it is one of the oldest fanclubs in Denmark. Aalborg BK's fan-culture is thriving, with both official and unofficial groups like Auxilia Ultras, AaB Tifo Kaos and Generationen offering fanatical support at all games home and away. All fan groups for Aalborg BK, both official and unofficial also work together under the name "Vesttribunen" (The Western-Stand), in reference to the tribune where the active fans stand. Some Ultras of Aalborg BK have a friendship with those of Hammarby IF and SK Brann.

AaB's traditional rivals are AGF with whom they contest "Den Jyske Klassiker" (The Jutland Classic), a match between the two largest cities
and most popular clubs in Jylland. The rivalry was most prominent in the 70's, 80's and 90's and has since declined in tension due to both
clubs starting to see FC Copenhagen and Brøndby IF as greater rivals. The creation of Randers FC also saw a new local-rivalry for AGF which
eased the tension with AaB as AGF developed a new and very intense rivalry with Randers FC.
The Jutland Classic is however still considered one of the biggest games in danish football, and the history and rivalry between the two
clubs shows on matchday with massive crowds, bold chanting and fanatical support between both sets of fans. The fans of both clubs still
considers it one of the biggest and most important games of the season.

Players

Current squad

Youth players in use

Out on loan

Retired numbers
12 –  Torben Boye, defender (1984–2001)

Notable former players

Current management

AaB Fodbold is owned by AaB A/S.

Head coaches
The following managers have coached AaB since it re-entered the Danish top-flight in 1986:
  Peter Rudbæk (1983–89)
  Poul Erik Andreasen (1 July 1990–95)
  Sepp Piontek (1 July 1995–96)
  Per Westergaard (1996–97)
  Lars Søndergaard (1997)
  Hans Backe (1998–00)
  Peter Rudbæk (2000–02)
  Poul Erik Andreasen (2002–03)
  Søren Kusk Larsen (2003)
  Erik Hamrén (1 January 2004 – 30 May 2008)
  Bruce Rioch (1 July 2008 – 23 October 2008)
  Allan Kuhn (interim) (24 October 2008 – 31 December 2008)
  Magnus Pehrsson (1 January 2009 – 11 October 2010)
  Kent Nielsen (11 October 2010 – 30 June 2015)
  Lars Søndergaard (22 June 2015 – 15 December 2016)
  Morten Wieghorst (2 January 2017 – 25 November 2018)
  Jacob Friis (25 November 2018 – 29 October 2020)
  Peter Feher  (interim) (29 October 2020 – 31 December 2020)
  Martí Cifuentes  (1 January 2021 – 24 January 2022)
  Oscar Hiljemark (interim) (24 January 2022 – 9 March 2022)
  Lars Friis  (9 March 2022 – 15 September 2022)
  Erik Hamrén (15 September 2022 – 20 March 2023)
  Oscar Hiljemark (20 March 2023 – )

Honours

Domestic

Leagues
 Danish Superliga
 Winner (4): 1994–95, 1998–99, 2007–08, 2013–14
 3rd place (3): 1935–36, 1969, 2006–07
 Danish 1st Division
 Winner (2): 1962, 1978
 Danish 2nd Division
 Winner (1): 1984
 49 seasons in the Highest Danish League
 19 seasons in the Second Highest Danish League
 5 seasons in the Third Highest Danish League

Cups
 Danish Cup
 Winner (3): 1965–66, 1969–70, 2013–14
 Runner-up (9): 1966–67, 1986–87, 1990–91, 1992–93, 1998–99, 1999–2000, 2003–04, 2008–09, 2019–20
 Danish Supercup
 Runner-up (3): 1995, 1999, 2004
 Viasat Cup
 Runner-up (1): 2006
 Provinsmesterskabsturneringen
 Winner (1): 1928
 Runner-up (1): 1929

European

 UEFA Champions League
 Group stage (2): 1995–96, 2008–09
 Play-off round (1): 2014–15
 3rd qualifying round (1): 1999–2000
 UEFA Europa League
 Round of 16 (1): 2008–09
 Round of 32 (1): 2014–15
 Group stage (1): 2007–08
 1st round (3): 1993–94, 1999–2000, 2004–05
 2nd qualifying round (2): 2009–10, 2013–14
 UEFA Cup Winners' Cup
 1st round (3): 1966–67, 1970–71, 1987–88
 UEFA Intertoto Cup
 Co-winner (1): 2007
 Group participants (3): 1996, 1997, 2000

Superliga history

{|class="wikitable"
|- bgcolor="#efefef"
! Season
!
! Pos.
! Pl.
! W
! D
! L
! GS
! GA
! P
!Cup
|-
|-
|1991
|SL
|align=right |6
|align=right|18||align=right|6||align=right|5||align=right|7
|align=right|29||align=right|33||align=right|17
|bgcolor=silver|final
|-
|1991–92
|SL
|align=right |6
|align=right|32||align=right|10||align=right|12||align=right|10
|align=right|45||align=right|44||align=right|32
|quarter-final
|-
|1992–93
|SL
|align=right |4
|align=right|32||align=right|12||align=right|12||align=right|8
|align=right|48||align=right|40||align=right|36
|bgcolor=silver|final
|-
|1993–94
|SL
|align=right |5
|align=right|32||align=right|8||align=right|15||align=right|9
|align=right|46||align=right|44||align=right|31
|quarter-final
|-
|1994–95
|SL
|align=right bgcolor=gold|1
|align=right|32||align=right|19||align=right|6||align=right|7
|align=right|74||align=right|38||align=right|44
|bgcolor=bronze|semi-final
|-
|1995–96
|SL
|align=right |5
|align=right|33||align=right|15||align=right|6||align=right|12
|align=right|57||align=right|38||align=right|51
|quarter-final
|-
|1996–97
|SL
|align=right |5
|align=right|33||align=right|12||align=right|11||align=right|10
|align=right|46||align=right|40||align=right|47
|quarter-final
|-
|1997–98
|SL
|align=right |7
|align=right|33||align=right|12||align=right|8||align=right|13
|align=right|54||align=right|48||align=right|44
|quarter-final
|-
|1998–99
|SL
|align=right bgcolor=gold|1
|align=right|33||align=right|17||align=right|13||align=right|3
|align=right|65||align=right|37||align=right|64
|bgcolor=silver|final
|-
|1999–00
|SL
|align=right |5
|align=right|33||align=right|12||align=right|13||align=right|8
|align=right|57||align=right|40||align=right|49
|bgcolor=silver|final
|-
|2000–01
|SL
|align=right |5
|align=right|33||align=right|13||align=right|10||align=right|10
|align=right|51||align=right|49||align=right|49
|5th round
|-
|2001–02
|SL
|align=right |4
|align=right|33||align=right|16||align=right|6||align=right|11
|align=right|52||align=right|45||align=right|54
|quarter-final
|-
|2002–03
|SL
|align=right |6
|align=right|33||align=right|14||align=right|4||align=right|15
|align=right|42||align=right|45||align=right|46
|bgcolor=bronze|semi-final
|-
|2003–04
|SL
|align=right |5
|align=right|33||align=right|16||align=right|9||align=right|8
|align=right|55||align=right|41||align=right|57
|bgcolor=silver|final
|-
|2004–05
|SL
|align=right |4
|align=right|33||align=right|15||align=right|8||align=right|10
|align=right|59||align=right|45||align=right|53
|5th round
|-
|2005–06
|SL
|align=right |5
|align=right|33||align=right|11||align=right|12||align=right|10
|align=right|48||align=right|44||align=right|45
|bgcolor=bronze|semi-final
|-
|2006–07
|SL
|align=right bgcolor=cc9966|3
|align=right|33||align=right|18||align=right|7||align=right|8
|align=right|55||align=right|34||align=right|61
|2nd round
|-
|2007–08
|SL
|align=right bgcolor=gold|1
|align=right|33||align=right|22||align=right|5||align=right|6
|align=right|60||align=right|38||align=right|71
|4th round
|-
|2008–09
|SL
|align=right |7
|align=right|33||align=right|9||align=right|12||align=right|12
|align=right|40||align=right|49||align=right|39
|bgcolor=silver|final
|-
|2009–10
|SL
|align=right |5
|align=right|33||align=right|13||align=right|9||align=right|11
|align=right|36||align=right|30||align=right|48
|4th round
|-
|2010–11
|SL
|align=right |10
|align=right|33||align=right|8||align=right|11||align=right|14
|align=right|38||align=right|48||align=right|35
|quarter-final
|-
|2011–12
|SL
|align=right |7
|align=right|33||align=right|12||align=right|8||align=right|13
|align=right|42||align=right|48||align=right|44
|2nd round
|-
|2012–13
|SL
|align=right |5
|align=right|33||align=right|13||align=right|8||align=right|12
|align=right|51||align=right|46||align=right|47
|4th round
|-
|2013–14
|SL
|align=right bgcolor=gold|1
|align=right|33||align=right|18||align=right|8||align=right|7
|align=right|60||align=right|38||align=right|62
|align=left bgcolor=gold|Winner
|-
|2014–15
|SL
|align=right |5
|align=right|33||align=right|13||align=right|9||align=right|11
|align=right|39||align=right|31||align=right|48
|quarter-final
|-
|2015–16
|SL
|align=right |5
|align=right|33||align=right|15||align=right|5||align=right|13
|align=right|56||align=right|44||align=right|50
|bgcolor=bronze|semi-final
|-
|2016–17
|SL
|align=right |10
|align=right|34||align=right|10||align=right|8||align=right|16
|align=right|31||align=right|49||align=right|38
|quarter-final
|-
|2017–18
|SL
|align=right |5
|align=right|36||align=right|10||align=right|15||align=right|11
|align=right|38||align=right|44||align=right|45
|quarter-final
|-
|2018–19
|SL
|align=right |9
|align=right|34||align=right|10||align=right|12||align=right|12
|align=right|44||align=right|44||align=right|42
|bgcolor=bronze|semi-final
|-
|2019–20
|SL
|align=right |5
|align=right|36||align=right|16||align=right|6||align=right|14
|align=right|54||align=right|44||align=right|54
|bgcolor=silver|final
|-
|2020–21
|SL
|align=right |7
|align=right|32||align=right|12||align=right|10||align=right|10
|align=right|44||align=right|41||align=right|46
|4th round
|-
|2021–22
|SL
|align=right |5
|align=right|32||align=right|13||align=right|6||align=right|13
|align=right|47||align=right|45||align=right|45
|4th round

|}

References

External links
  
 Aalborg BK UEFA.com
  Aalborg Boldspilklub af 1885 (Amateur foundation)
  Aalborg Support Club (Official fanclub of AaB)
  AaBfan.dk (Amateur news site about AaB)

 
Fodbold
Association football clubs established in 1885
Football clubs in Denmark
Sport in Aalborg
1885 establishments in Denmark